Deceived Slumming Party is a 1908 American comedy film directed by D. W. Griffith. Several scenes of tours being conducted in New York City. At the end of each scene it becomes obvious that the events of the tours have been set up to shock and defraud the tourists.

Cast
 Edward Dillon as Guide (as Eddie Dillon)   
 D. W. Griffith as Reginald O.C. Wittington     
 George Gebhardt as Chinese    
 Charles Inslee as Chinese  
 Anthony O'Sullivan as Chinese  
 Mack Sennett as Policeman / Waiter
 Harry Solter as Chinese

See also
 D. W. Griffith filmography
 List of American films of 1908

External links 

1908 films
Films directed by D. W. Griffith
American silent short films
American black-and-white films
1908 comedy films
1908 short films
Silent American comedy films
American comedy short films
1900s American films